The 1840 United States presidential election in Indiana took place between October 30 and December 2, 1840, as part of the 1840 United States presidential election. Voters chose nine representatives, or electors to the Electoral College, who voted for President and Vice President.

Indiana voted for the Whig candidate, William Henry Harrison, over Democratic candidate Martin Van Buren. Harrison won Indiana by a margin of 11.72%.

Results

See also
 United States presidential elections in Indiana

References

Indiana
1840
1840 Indiana elections